Mordellistena nigella is a species of beetle in the genus Mordellistena of the family Mordellidae. It was described by Lijeblad in 1945.

References

Beetles described in 1945
nigella